The 2018 Copa Paulista is the 20th edition of São Paulo State Cup. 27 teams are participate in the tournament. The winner gets to choose between a qualification spot for the 2019 Copa do Brasil or the 2019 Campeonato Brasileiro Série D. The spot not chosen by the winners will be taken by the second-placed team.

Format 
First Stage: The clubs will be divided into four groups according to their location. The top four of each group will advance to the second stage.

Second Stage: The 16 clubs will be divided into four groups of four. The winner and runners-up of each group will advance to the Knockout stage.

Each stage will be played in a double round-robin format.

Qualified teams 

 Água Santa
 Atibaia
 Audax
 Batatais
 Bragantino
 Desportivo Brasil
 Ferroviária
 Inter de Limeira
 Ituano
 Juventus
 Mirassol
 Nacional
 Noroeste
Novorizontino
 Olímpia
 Penapolense
 Portuguesa
 Red Bull Brasil
 Rio Claro
 Santo André
 Santos
 São Bernardo
 São Caetano
 Taboão da Serra
 Taubaté
 Votuporanguense
 XV de Piracicaba

First stage

Group 1

Group 2

Group 3

Group 4

References

External links 

 Federação Paulista de Futebol 

Copa Paulista
Copa Paulista, 2018
2018 in Brazilian football leagues